Madžari is a village in Croatia.

References

Populated places in Sisak-Moslavina County